Norrbotten, known in English as North Bothnia, is a Swedish province (landskap) in northernmost Sweden. It borders south to Västerbotten, west to Swedish Lapland, and east to Finland.

Administration 
The traditional provinces of Sweden serve no administrative or political purposes, but are historical and cultural entities. In this case, however, the county is older than the province. When the new national border to the Russian Grand Duchy of Finland formed, the province of Västerbotten split in two, and formed the municipalities of Kolari, Muonio, Pello, Tornio, and Ylitornio. However, Finnish Västerbotten is not recognized enough as its own historical province, so it's usually merged instead with Ostrobothnia, however leaving out Muonio to Laponia. The northernmost of the counties of Sweden were created in 1810 consisting of the northern parts of Lappland and Västerbotten. After that, northern Västerbotten has gradually evolved as a province of its own.

Heraldry 
Not being one of the old historical provinces of Sweden Norrbotten had not been granted a coat of arms in the same way as the others. As recently as 1995, after decades of controversy, Norrbotten got its arms, thus recognized as a "real" province.

History 

During the Middle ages, the area was sparsely populated by Sami people, who lived on hunting, fishing and reindeer herding. From the Middle Ages and forward, the Swedish kings tried hard to colonise and Christianize the area. Settlers from the then eastern half of Sweden, Finland – the most important of which were known as Birkarls ~ controlled the trade and even the taxing on the area long into the 16th century. From the mid-16th century, the area was more firmly tied to Sweden. An important sign of Swedish control was the large Nederluleå stone church from 1492. Still today, Finnish and Sami minorities live in Norrbotten and they have kept their culture and language.

Historically, Västerbotten was the denomination for northern Sweden, together with the Lappland areas. The Eastern Botten or Ostrobothnia was in the Finnish side.

Cultural identification in Sweden is closely related to the historical provinces, and the people in Norrbotten live in this sense in Northern Västerbotten, or Norra Västerbotten. In order not to be confused with people from Southern Västerbotten, i.e. the coastal region of Västerbotten County, they started to identify themselves with the county rather than with the historical province.

Norrbotten had gradually become synonymous with the area that was previously referred to as northern Västerbotten. It started to evolve as a separate province. During the 20th century it got all of the symbols (animals, flowers etc.) which are assigned to the other provinces of Sweden. But there was still some resistance to the idea of Norrbotten being a province.

As recently as 1995, after decades of debate, Norrbotten was granted a coat of arms, thus at last being fully recognized as one of provinces of Sweden.

The coat of arms symbolizes the four large rivers in Norrbotten that drain into the Gulf of Bothnia: Torne River, Kalix River, Lule River and Pite River.

The summers can bring surprisingly warm temperatures for such northerly latitudes, and Norrbotten holds the all-time high temperature record for the entire Norrland at 37 °C (98 °F).

Population 
As of 31 December 2016, the population is 195,024, distributed over 26,671 km2, which gives a density of 7.3 inhabitants/km2.

Culture 
Norrbotten has around 8,000 ancient remains. Languages spoken in the province include Swedish (including North Swedish regiolects), Meänkieli, Finnish, and Sami. Some Meänkieli speakers have gradually been considering themselves part of the Kven people, which supposedly arrived to the area much earlier than the Swedish settlers.

The Church Village of Gammelstad outside Luleå has been named a UNESCO World Heritage Site.

Sports 
Football in the province (and Norrbotten County as a whole) is administered by Norrbottens Fotbollförbund. Ice hockey is also popular, with Luleå HF, and basketball with the BC Luleå men's team and the Luleå BBK women's team.

References

External links 
 North Bothnia flag A discussion on "what is North Bothnia"

 
Provinces of Sweden